Bernhard Heisig (31 March 1925 – 10 June 2011) was a German painter and graphic artist. Long-time director of the Leipzig Academy (Hochschule für Grafik und Buchkunst; 1961–64, 1976–87) and a leading figure in East Germany's Leipzig School, which included Wolfgang Mattheuer and Werner Tübke, he painted in the tradition of Max Beckmann, Otto Dix, and Oskar Kokoschka. His experiences from World War II on both the western and eastern fronts were a recurring subject in his art beginning in the late 1960s, and it is for these works that he is best known in the West. Highly regarded on both sides of the Berlin Wall in the 1980s, he was at the center of controversy after German unification when his painting Time and Life was selected to hang in the German parliament.  The painting is a panorama of German history and hangs in the cafeteria on the first floor of the Reichstag building. The controversy was part of the larger German-German Bilderstreit (image battle) over what role East German art and artists should be allowed to play in the new Germany.

References

Further reading
 April Eisman, Bernhard Heisig and the Fight for Modern Art in East Germany (Camden House, 2018). .
 April Eisman, "Denying Difference in the Post-Socialist Other: Bernhard Heisig and the Changing Reception of an East German Artist." Contemporaneity: Historical Presence in Visual Culture, no. 2 (2012): 45-73 (PDF).
 Renate Hartleb, Bernhard Heisig (Verlag der Kunst, Dresden 1975).
 Karl Max Kober, Bernhard Heisig (Dresden: Verlag der Kunst, 1981).
 Jörn Merkert & Peter Pachnicke, Bernhard Heisig: Retrospektive (Munich: Prestel Verlag, 1989).
 Dietulf Sander, Bernhard Heisig als Buchillustrator (Leipzig: Faber & Faber, 2007).

External links
 

1925 births
2011 deaths
Artists from Wrocław
People from the Province of Lower Silesia
Socialist Unity Party of Germany members
20th-century German painters
20th-century German male artists
21st-century German painters
21st-century German male artists
German contemporary artists
German male painters
Recipients of the National Prize of East Germany
Recipients of the Patriotic Order of Merit (honor clasp)
Academic staff of the Hochschule für Grafik und Buchkunst Leipzig